Józef Zapędzki (11 March 1929 – 15 February 2022) was a Polish sport shooter.

He competed at five consecutive Olympics from 1964 to 1980 in 25 m rapid fire pistol and won two gold medals, in 1968 and 1972. He is one of three shooters to have successfully defended the men's 25 m rapid fire pistol Olympic title. He is a 23-time Polish Champion. Throughout most of his sporting career, he represented the Śląsk Wrocław sports club. Zapędzki died in Wrocław on 15 February 2022, at the age of 92.

References

Further reading

 
 
 

1929 births
2022 deaths
People from Łazy
People from Kielce Voivodeship (1919–1939)
Polish male sport shooters
ISSF pistol shooters
Olympic shooters of Poland
Shooters at the 1964 Summer Olympics
Shooters at the 1968 Summer Olympics
Shooters at the 1972 Summer Olympics
Shooters at the 1976 Summer Olympics
Shooters at the 1980 Summer Olympics
Olympic gold medalists for Poland
Olympic medalists in shooting
Sportspeople from Silesian Voivodeship
Medalists at the 1968 Summer Olympics
Medalists at the 1972 Summer Olympics